Anthony Mitchell (24 October 1868- 17 January 1917) was bishop of Aberdeen and Orkney from 1912 to 1917.

Biography
He was ordained in 1892, after studying at the University of Aberdeen, Gonville and Caius College, Cambridge, the University of Edinburgh, and the Episcopal Theological College. In 1905 he became canon of St. Mary's Cathedral, Edinburgh, and was appointed Bishop of Aberdeen and Orkney in 1912, a post he held until his death. In addition to his clerical work, he was a respected ecclesiastical historian.

References

Obituary: p. 155, The Annual Register: a review of public events at home and abroad, for the year 1917. London: Longmans, Green and Co. 1918.

Bishops of Aberdeen and Orkney
1868 births
1917 deaths
Alumni of the University of Aberdeen
Alumni of the University of Edinburgh
Alumni of Gonville and Caius College, Cambridge
Doctors of Divinity